William Barclay Allen (born 1944) is an American political scientist. He has been Professor of Political Philosophy and dean of James Madison College at Michigan State University in East Lansing, Michigan. He was a member of the National Council on the Humanities from 1984 to 1987 and chairman of the United States Commission on Civil Rights from 1988 to 1989.

Allen's fields are political philosophy, American government, and jurisprudence. He is considered an authority in matters of a liberal arts education.

Biography

Allen was born in Fernandina Beach, Florida, in 1944, as the oldest of twelve children of a Baptist preacher. During high school, he studied science at Virginia Union University, but his interests shifted to politics and philosophy, and he moved to Pepperdine College, where he graduated in 1967 (B.A.) and received the M.A. (1968) and Ph.D. (1972) from Claremont Graduate University. In 1970–71, he was Fulbright Advanced Teaching Fellow at the University of Rouen in France. He was appointed assistant professor at the School of Government and Public Administration at American University in 1971 and the next year he became Assistant Professor of Government at Harvey Mudd College in 1972, with tenure in 1976. He was promoted to Associate Professor in 1976 and served as full Professor from 1983 to 1994.

Allen was a member of the National Council on the Humanities 1984–87. He resigned to take a seat on the United States Commission on Civil Rights, on which he served until 1992. He was chairman of the commission from August 8, 1988, to October 23, 1989.

Allen was Dean and Professor at James Madison College, Michigan State University, 1993–98. Under his leadership, the college gained broad national recognition as a center of liberal education, faculty and student life was vivified, and faculty productivity saw a dramatic increase. The following year, he was executive director of the State Council of Higher Education for Virginia. During his tenure, Council staff and operations were thoroughly reorganized, focusing on its two statutory obligations – public policy recommendations, and administration of educational programs.  Under his guidance the agency developed major strategic planning, funding formula, program assessment, and general education recommendations. He successfully put questions like making colleges more accountable for the state money they get on the agenda in Virginia.

In 2002–05, Allen was Director of a Program in Public Policy and Administration at Michigan State University, and in 2004–06 Chairman of the Working Group for the Improvement of Undergraduate Education at Michigan State University. In 2006–07, he was Ann & Herbert W. Vaughan Visiting Fellow in the James Madison Program at Princeton University, and in 2008–09, he was Visiting Senior Scholar in the Matthew J. Ryan Center for the Study of Free Institutions and the Public Good at Villanova University. He is currently the 2018–19 Visiting Scholar in Conservative Thought and Policy at the University of Colorado Boulder's Center for Western Civilization, Thought & Policy.

He also has served on the boards of the Hoover Institution (1995–) and St. John's College (1989–). Since 2002, he has been Academic Advisor and Faculty Member at the Institute for Responsible Citizenship in Washington, D.C.

Allen is chairman and co-founder of Toward A Fair Michigan, whose mission was to further understanding of the equal opportunity issues involved in guaranteeing civil rights for all citizens, and to provide a civic forum for a fair and open exchange of views on the question of affirmative action.

Allen is the father of classicist and political scientist Danielle Allen.

Fellowships and awards
 Booker T. Washington Legacy Award, Heartland Institute, Chicago, IL.
 Fulbright Senior Specialists Roster, 2002–07.
 LL.D. (honoris causa), Averett College, 1998.
 1997 Templeton Honor Roll (individually and institutionally).
 Ll.D. (honoris causa), 1988, Pepperdine University.
 Commission on the Bicentennial of the United States Constitution, Bicentennial Educational Grant Program, 1988–89.
 Earhart Foundation Research Grant, 1986–87.
 Prix Montesquieu, 1986, Academie de Montesquieu.
 Member, Académie de Montesquieu, 1984.
 Kellogg National Fellow, Kellogg Foundation, 1984–87.

Select bibliography
 George Washington: America’s First Progressive (Peter Lang, Inc.), 2008.
 The Personal and the Political: Three Fables by Montesquieu (UPA), 2008.
 Re-Thinking Uncle Tom: The Political Philosophy of H. B. Stowe (Lexington Books), 2008.
 Habits of Mind: Fostering Excellence and Access in Higher Education, with Carol M. Allen (Transaction Publishers, Inc.), 2003.
 George Washington: A Collection, editor and Introduction (Liberty Press, 1988), 3rd printing, 2003.
 The Essential Antifederalist: Second Edition, with Gordon Lloyd (Rowman & Littlefield), 2002.
 The Federalist Papers: A Commentary: The "Baton Rouge Lectures". A full-length commentary, plus an analytical legal index (Peter Lang, Inc.), 2000.
 Let the Advice Be Good: A Defense of Madison’s Democratic Nationalism (University Press of America), 1994.

See also
 United States Commission on Civil Rights

References

External links
 Dr. William B. Allen personal homepage
 

1944 births
Living people
Pepperdine University alumni
Claremont Graduate University alumni
People from Fernandina Beach, Florida
Writers from Lansing, Michigan
American University faculty and staff
Harvey Mudd College faculty
United States Commission on Civil Rights members
James Madison University faculty
African-American political scientists
American social scientists
Templeton Prize laureates
American political philosophers
African-American philosophers
20th-century American philosophers
21st-century American philosophers
Earhart Foundation Fellows
20th-century African-American people
21st-century African-American people
Fulbright alumni